Batti may refer to:

Arts 
 Batti Gul Meter Chalu (transl. Lights off, meter on), a 2018 Indian social problem film directed by Shree Narayan Singh 
 Katti Batti, an Indian romantic comedy-drama film directed by Nikkhil Advani
 Laal Batti, a Punjabi novel written by Baldev Singh.
 Teen Batti Char Raasta, a 1953 Hindi comedy-drama film directed by V. Shantaram

Other uses 
 Cher Batti, a strange dancing light phenomenon occurring on dark nights, reported from the Banni grasslands
 INS Batti Malv (T67), the 3rd ship of Bangaram-class patrol vessel of the Indian Navy
 Jeannette Batti (1921–2011), a French film actress